Henry Shull Farmhouse Inn was a historic home located near Garrett in Keyser Township, DeKalb County, Indiana.  It was built in 1839, and was a -story, Greek Revival-style frame dwelling. It had a low gable roof and corner pilasters. It was originally built as a farmhouse and inn.  It has been demolished.

It was added to the National Register of Historic Places in 1983.

References

Houses on the National Register of Historic Places in Indiana
Greek Revival houses in Indiana
Houses completed in 1839
Houses in DeKalb County, Indiana
National Register of Historic Places in DeKalb County, Indiana